Golf por Movistar Plus+ is a Spanish television own and operated by Telefónica.

References

External links
Official site

Movistar+
Television stations in Spain
Television channels and stations established in 2002
Sports television in Spain